

"Rocket Sneaker / One × Time" is Ai Otsuka's 17th (18th overall) single released under the avex trax label. It is her first single released in 2008, on May 21. 

"Rocket Sneaker / One × Time" has been certified Gold by RIAJ for shipment of 100,000 copies . However, it is her lowest selling single.

Track listing

Rocket Sneaker is a piano-driven tune, reminiscent of rag-time music. It describes saying "thank you" to the Earth before going off it, but remembering that one is always "chikyuukko". One × Time is a more mature love song, describing feelings of true love. It is lyrically confusing, but Ai revealed that it is from the viewpoint of a clock. Sora to Kujira is more of rock/pop song describing a whale that returns to the sky to join its mama (papa in the second chorus).

Music video

The Rocket Sneaker PV features Ai in stop-motion frames as the camera goes around a path of frozen figures of her doing everyday things. During the chorus, many of her begin to sing in unison. At the end of it, the very last Ai starts to move around, revealing that the path is a loop, and then she starts to go around the path, as the other Ai's have vanished.

Despite its status as an A-side song, One × Time doesn't have a video.

Charts

Oricon Sales Chart (Japan)

References

Ai Otsuka songs
2008 singles
2008 songs
Songs written by Ai Otsuka
Avex Trax singles